Ge Huijie / 葛荟婕 (born February 22, 1987) is a Chinese model. In 2002, she won the NICE cup, and was runner-up in 2004 at the Pierre Cardin International Model Contest. At 17, she entered a relationship with Wang Feng, a Chinese rock musician, breaking up two years later. She has also acted in some films and television series, and was featured on the cover of Marie Claire magazine.

Early life and career
Ge was born in Jinhua, a city in central Zhejiang province.
Ge says she was extremely rebellious as a youth, having run away from school in the seventh grade following a dispute with her mother. In 2002, she won the NICE cup, and was runner-up at the 2004 Pierre Cardin International Model Contest. She was also featured on the cover of Marie Claire magazine. At age 17, she entered a relationship with Wang Feng, with whom she has one child. They broke up two years later; she stated she was too young for a serious relationship at the time. Ge has acted in some productions. In 2010, she starred in Youzhong, a film directed by Zhang Yuan. Ge starred in the Chinese reality television series Mood for Love in 2012.

References

People from Jinhua
Chinese female models
1987 births
Living people

External Links
 葛荟婕 官方微博
  Pinterest News